Lamberto Zannier (born 15 June 1954) is an Italian diplomat

Biography
He was OSCE High Commissioner on National Minorities and earlier served as the Secretary General of the OSCE (Organization for Security and Co-operation in Europe).

Previously, from June 2008 to June 2011, Zannier served as the United Nations Special Representative for Kosovo and Head of the United Nations Interim Administration Mission in Kosovo (UNMIK), with the rank of UN Undersecretary-General. He was appointed to this position by UN Secretary-General Ban Ki-moon in June 2008. 

Zannier has served for the Foreign Service of Italy for almost 40 years. Before his appointment as Special Representative of the UN Secretary-General for Kosovo, he played a leading role at the Italian Ministry of Foreign Affairs as a coordinator for EU Foreign Policy and as a Coordinator for EU Security and Defence issues. Between 2002 and 2006, he was Director of the Conflict Prevention Centre of the Organization for Security and Cooperation in Europe in Vienna. In this capacity, he managed more than 20 civilian field operations in Europe and Central Asia.

From 2000 to 2002, he served as Representative of Italy to the Executive Council of the Organisation for the Prohibition of Chemical Weapons in The Hague. From 1997 to 1999, he was chairperson of the negotiations on the adaptation of the Treaty on Conventional Armed Forces in Europe. From 1991 to 1997, he served as Head of Disarmament, Arms Control and Cooperative Security at the North Atlantic Treaty Organization.  Previously, he served in Rome, Abu Dhabi and Vienna, mainly specialising in multilateral and security affairs. He has authored several publications on security, conflict prevention and crisis management issues. He routinely holds lessons and conferences on international relations and international security. 

Zannier obtained a law degree and an honorary degree in international and diplomatic sciences from the University of Trieste.

Honors
 Grand Officer of the Order of Merit of the Italian Republic – October 10, 2016

References

External links

http://www.unmikonline.org/srsg/index.htm
http://www.osce.org/sg
https://picasaweb.google.com/106300276306639329741/TheBestOfOSCEBall2016
 

Italian diplomats
20th-century diplomats
1954 births
Living people
NATO officials
United Nations Mission in Kosovo
Organization for Security and Co-operation in Europe
University of Trieste alumni
Special Representatives of the Secretary-General of the United Nations
People from the Province of Udine
OSCE Secretaries General